Hackney Downs is a ward in the London Borough of Hackney, corresponding roughly to the Hackney Downs area of London, UK and forms part of the Hackney North and Stoke Newington constituency.

It was created for the May 2002 local election. There was previously a Downs ward from 1965 to 1978.

Elections 
The ward returns three councillors every four years to Hackney Borough Council. At the last election, held on 3 May 2018, Michael Desmond, Anna-Joy Rickard and Sem Moema, all Labour Party candidates, were returned. Turnout was 39.7%.

Demography 
In 2001, Hackney Downs ward had a total population of 10,294. This compares with the average ward population within the borough of 10,674.

At the 2011 Census, the population of the ward had increased to 12,921.

References

External links
 London Borough of Hackney list of constituencies and councillors.
 Hackney Downs Councillors website.

Wards of the London Borough of Hackney
2002 establishments in England